Glenna Collett Vare (June 20, 1903 – February 3, 1989) was an American Hall of Fame golfing champion whom the Hall calls the greatest female golfer of her day, and who dominated American women's golf in the 1920s.

Biography
Born in New Haven, Connecticut, Glenna Collett was raised in Providence, Rhode Island, by athletic-minded parents and at a young age was involved in sports such as swimming and diving. At age 14, she took up the game of golf, and within two years had developed her skills to the point where she competed in the 1919 U.S. Women's Amateur, and won her first-round match. Two years later at age 18, she was the Championship medallist for shooting the lowest qualifying score.

In the pre-professional era, the U.S. Women's Amateur was the most prestigious event in the country. Her strength was off the tee. Collett was a student of golf instructor Ernest Jones.

While setting a new single-round scoring record in 1922, Glenna Collett claimed her first of six U.S. championships. The following year, she was upset in the third round but went north to win the Canadian Women's Amateur. In 1924, Glenna Collett achieved the most remarkable record in golfing history, both female and male.

Despite setting a new single-round qualifying scoring record, Collett lost by a fluke in the semifinal of the 1924 U.S. Women's Amateur when on the 19th hole, Mary Browne's ball caromed off hers and into the cup. However, that would be her only loss in a year where she won an astonishing 59 out of 60 matches, including her second consecutive Canadian championship.

Glenna Collett won the U.S. Women's Amateur again in 1925 and then reeled off three straight titles between 1928 and 1930. Between 1928 and 1931, she recorded 16 consecutive tournament victories. She won six North and South Women's Amateurs, six Women's Eastern Amateurs, and in between all this she was the runner-up in the 1929 and 1930 British Ladies Amateurs.

She also went to France, where she won the French Women's Amateur. After marrying Edwin H. Vare Jr. and having two children, Glenna Collett-Vare came back in 1934 but lost in the semi-finals to Virginia Van Wie. However, the following year, she won her sixth U.S. championship by defeating future star Patty Berg in the finals.

Glenna Collett-Vare was a member of the American team that won the first Curtis Cup played at the Wentworth Golf Club in England in 1932. She served as player-captain in 1934, 1936, 1938, and 1948. After winning 49 championships, she ended her competitive golf career at the age of 56, with a victory at the 1959 Rhode Island Women's Golf Association tournament.

She was the author of two books on golf: Golf For Young Players in 1926, and Ladies in the Rough in 1928.

Since 1953, the Ladies Professional Golf Association has awarded the Vare Trophy to the golfer who has the lowest average strokes per round in professional tour events.

In 1965, Collett-Vare was the recipient of the Bob Jones Award, the United States Golf Association's highest honor given in recognition of distinguished sportsmanship in golf. In 1975, she was part of the first class inducted into the World Golf Hall of Fame. At the age of 81, she still had a 15 handicap and played in her 61st consecutive Invitational event in 1984 at the Point Judith Country Club in Rhode Island.

Death and legacy
Collett Vare died in 1989 in Gulf Stream, Florida. In her 1977 book, One Hundred Greatest Women in Sports, author Phyllis Hollander listed Glenna Collett Vare ahead of Babe Zaharias and Patty Berg, stating that "her career was unequaled in the annals of golf". Gene Sarazen called her "the greatest woman golfer of all time".

Team appearances
Amateur
Curtis Cup (representing the United States): 1932 (winners), 1934 (non-playing captain), 1936 (tie, Cup retained, playing captain), 1938 (winners), 1948 (winners, playing captain), 1950 (non-playing captain)

Books
 Golf For Young Players by Glenna Collett (1926) – Little, Brown and Company
 Ladies in the Rough by Glenna Collett with a foreword by Bobby Jones (1928) – Alfred A. Knopf

References

 One Hundred Greatest Women in Sports – Phyllis Hollander (1977). Putnam

External links

Glenna Collett Vare bio

American female golfers
Amateur golfers
Golf writers and broadcasters
Winners of ladies' major amateur golf championships
World Golf Hall of Fame inductees
Golfers from Connecticut
Golfers from Rhode Island
Lincoln School (Providence, Rhode Island) alumni
Sportspeople from New Haven, Connecticut
Sportspeople from Providence, Rhode Island
1903 births
1989 deaths
20th-century American women
20th-century American people